Scarlet Diva is a 2000 Italian film by actress and first-time director and screenwriter Asia Argento.

Plot summary
Scarlet Diva is a semi-autobiographical film about the Italian actress and director Asia Argento's life as an actress. A self-destructive streak in Anna Battista (Argento) pulls her into drugs, sex and other excesses. To combat this descent, she attempts to fulfill her creative side by becoming a film director. Battista's attempts to realize her talent are thwarted by her desires and the uncaring responses of those around her. As part of her plans to become a director and bring her story to the screen, Battista travels to Los Angeles but only meets a shady film producer (Joe Coleman). She falls in love with an uncaring Australian rock and roll star (Jean Sheperd), then finds out she is pregnant by him. But her life is still in disarray as she uses drugs to help herself feel better.

Cast

 Asia Argento as Anna Battista
Gloria Pirrocco as Young Anna
 Jean Sheperd as Kirk Vaines
 Herbert Fritsch as Aaron Ulrich 
 Francesca D'Aloja as Margherita
 Vera Gemma as Veronica Lanza
 Daria Nicolodi as Anna's Mother
 Selen as Quelou
 Leo Gullotta as Dr. Vessi
 Joe Coleman as Mr. Paar
 Justinian Kfoury as J-Bird
 Schoolly D as Hash-Man
 Leonardo Servadio as Young Alioscia
 Paolo Bonacelli as Swiss Journalist

Production
Scarlet Diva was shot entirely on digital video, making it among the earliest feature films to be created with this technology.

Though penetration isn't explicitly showed, Asia Argento revealed the sex scenes went way beyond acting. "It's true, the sex scenes are real. But I wasn't interested in penetration. I was interested in showing what the real sex did to the faces and the bodies of the actors," she said.

Harvey Weinstein reenactment scene
In October 2017, Argento revealed that the scene in which the producer tries to assault the main character is based on the alleged 
sexual assault on her by Harvey Weinstein, except "In the movie [...] I ran away" according to Argento.

Reception and legacy
The film tied with two other films to win the Brooklyn Film Festival Award for Best New Director.

A videocassette of the film can be seen on a shelf behind the counter in a video rental store in Dario Argento's film Do You Like Hitchcock?

References

External links
 

2000 films
2000s erotic drama films
2000s English-language films
2000s French-language films
2000s Italian-language films
Films directed by Asia Argento
Films set in the United States
Italian erotic drama films
2000 directorial debut films
2000 drama films
2000 multilingual films
Italian multilingual films
Harvey Weinstein